Sarkam is a village in Siyahu Rural District, Fin District, Bandar Abbas County, Hormozgan Province, Iran. At the 2006 census, its population was 17, in 6 families.

References 

Populated places in Bandar Abbas County